Turkish Cypriot Chamber of Commerce (Turkish: Kıbrıs Türk Ticaret Odası) is a chamber of commerce and was founded in Nicosia in 1958 and represents businesses in the Turkish Republic of Northern Cyprus. It has around 3000 members as of 2011 and membership is obligatory for Northern Cypriot businesses.

Chambers of commerce in Cyprus
Society of Northern Cyprus
Organizations established in 1958
1958 establishments in Cyprus